David Stringel Vallejo (born March 26, 1986) is a former Mexican professional footballer who last played for Potros UAEM.

External links
 
 

Living people
1986 births
Mexican footballers
Association football defenders
C.F. Monterrey players
Indios de Ciudad Juárez footballers
Correcaminos UAT footballers
Altamira F.C. players
Querétaro F.C. footballers
Toros Neza footballers
Cruz Azul Hidalgo footballers
Dorados de Sinaloa footballers
FC Juárez footballers
Atlante F.C. footballers
Potros UAEM footballers
Liga MX players
Ascenso MX players
Footballers from Mexico City